Vox populi is a 2008 Dutch political satire comedy film written and directed by Eddy Terstall. The lead roles are played by Tom Jansen, Tara Elders, and Johnny de Mol. Ton Kas won a Golden Calf Award for Best Supporting Actor.

Together with Simon in 2004 and SEXtet in 2007, it is part of a trilogy about contemporary Dutch society. It received mainly average reviews.

Plot 
Jos Fransen (Jansen) is a veteran politician experiencing a midlife crisis. He's the leader of the left-wing party Rood-Groen (Red-Green), but the party hasn't been polling well lately. His daughter Zoë (Elders) starts dating military police officer Sjef (De Mol). Sjef's father Nico (Kas) is an authentic Amsterdam car salesman who hates politicians. Through the eyes of Sjef and Nico, Jos is starting to get a feel of how "the people" look at politics. Inspired by Sjef, Nico, and Sjef's Yugoslav brother-in-law Savo, Jos Fransen starts including more populist ideas into his, previously, politically correct party and starts rising in the opinion polls. This all much to the chagrin of his elitist fellow party members.

Cast 
 Tom Jansen as Jos Fransen
 Johnny de Mol as Sjef
 Esmarel Gasman as Nina
 Tara Elders as Zoë
 Bata Miodrag Milojevic as Savo
 Femke Lakerveld as Mira
 Ton Kas as Nico
 Marion van Thijn as Geesje
 Beppie Melissen as Gees
 Hilde Van Mieghem as Peggy

External links

References 

2008 films
2008 comedy films
Dutch comedy films
Dutch satirical films
Dutch political satire films
Films directed by Eddy Terstall
Midlife crisis films
2000s Dutch-language films